The Visteon Dockable Entertainment System (officially referred to as Dockable Entertainment featuring Game Boy Advance) is a portable DVD player created by Visteon in 2006 for the US market at an MSRP of $1299 USD. The player is notable for containing officially licensed Game Boy Advance hardware, as Visteon partnered with Nintendo to announce the product at CES 2006. Initially due out in April, the product was then delayed to May before finally launching in July of that year. To celebrate the product's launch Visteon held a photography and writing contest.

The device was not sold at general retailers, but rather at car dealerships in combination with a roof docking head mount for installation, or already equipped in select models of certain vehicles.

On April 1, 2008, Visteon introduced a model mounted into headrests for $1699. Later that year the company expressed interest in creating similar products for the Nintendo DS and Wii platforms, though neither materialized.

Hardware specifications
The most common roof-mountable version is based on the Visteon XV101 portable DVD player, and shares specifications in all aspects except those regarding Game Boy Advance compatibility.

10.2" Flip Down LCD Display
6-Pin Auxiliary Port
Infrared Port
DVD Drive
Game Boy Advance Cartridge Slot

Alongside this, the player came with a wireless game controller (a modified Sky Active gamepad), a set of wireless headphones, a remote control, and compatibility with MP3 and WMA CD files.

Unique to the headrest model was a 7" TFT LCD screen, backlit DVD controls plus an additional remote, headphone and game controller.

Neither version of the hardware was backwards compatible with Game Boy or Game Boy Color games.

References

External links 

 
 

Regionless game consoles
Sixth-generation video game consoles
ARM-based video game consoles
 
Home video game consoles
Video hardware